This article contains a list of treaties by number of parties to the treaty. A "party" to a treaty is a state or other entity that ratifies, accedes to, approves, or succeeds to the treaty.

General principles of ratification
In general, multilateral treaties are open to ratification by any state. Some treaties may also be ratified by supranational bodies, such as the European Union, and by other international organizations.

In practice, the depositary of a treaty will usually only recognise ratifications of the treaty that are performed by a state that is recognised as a state at international law. A state can be formally recognised as such by becoming a member of the United Nations; there are currently  member states of the United Nations. The only non-UN states that undoubtedly meet the standard of statehood are the Cook Islands and Niue, who have had their "full treaty-making capacity" recognised by the United Nations Secretariat.  The Holy See (Vatican City) is also widely recognised as being able to legitimately ratify treaties, and has been granted non-member observer state status by the UN General Assembly. Following the UNGA passing a resolution granting non-member observer state status to the State of Palestine, the UNSG has begun to recognize its right to ratify treaties. Ratifications performed by other states with more limited recognition—such as Abkhazia, the Republic of Artsakh (Nagorno-Karabakh), the Republic of China (Taiwan), Kosovo, Northern Cyprus, the Sahrawi Arab Democratic Republic (Western Sahara), Somaliland, South Ossetia, and Transnistria—have usually not been recognised by treaty depositaries as states that can ratify treaties, although there are some exceptions to this general rule.

If a state party to a treaty denounces the treaty, the state (often after a certain period before the denunciation takes effect) is no longer a party to the treaty, although in some cases certain parts of the treaty may continue to apply.

Ratifications by defunct states
States change over time, and often a state that ratified a treaty will cease to exist. International law deals with this issue in two ways. First, it is possible for a state to be declared the successor state to the defunct state. In this situation, any ratifications performed by the defunct state are transferred to and attributed to the successor state. Examples of successor states are the Russian Federation (successor to the Soviet Union), People's Republic of China (successor to the mainland Republic of China), Serbia (successor to Serbia and Montenegro), Belarus (successor to the Byelorussian SSR), Ukraine (successor to the Ukrainian SSR), and Tanzania (successor to Tanganyika). It is possible for a single state to be the successor state of multiple states, as with Yemen being the successor state of both North Yemen and South Yemen.

Second, some states have no legal successor state but cease to exist; in such cases, the ratifications performed by the state are disregarded. In some cases, such states are subsumed into an existing state, as when East Germany merged into the Federal Republic of Germany, and when Zanzibar merged into Tanzania (at first United Republic of Tanganyika and Zanzibar). In other cases, the defunct state is divided into two or more states, with none of the states being designated as the formal successor state. Examples of the latter situation include SFR Yugoslavia (now six independent states) and Czechoslovakia (now two independent states). In this situation, the new states usually declare which treaties the defunct state ratified continue to have force for the new state. Such a declaration is regarded as a "ratification" by the new state.

For purposes of the numbers in this list, only ratifications, accessions, or successions of currently existing states are considered. No regard is given to ratifications by defunct states that have no current successor state.

Maximum limits to ratification numbers
Due to these limitations, in 2021, the maximum number of state ratifications that a multilateral treaty can have is 198; this total consists of all 193 UN member states; both UN observer states, the Holy See (Vatican City) and the State of Palestine; as well as the Cook Islands, Niue, and Kosovo (member states of eight, five, and two UN specialized agencies respectively). If supranational or other international organizations ratify the treaty, the total number of ratifications may exceed 198.

Legal effect of a high number of ratifications
When a treaty is ratified by nearly all recognized states in the world, the legal principles contained in the treaty may become customary international law. Customary international law applies to all states, whether or not the state has ratified a treaty that enshrines the principle. There is no set number of ratifications that are required to convert a treaty's principles into customary international law, and states and experts often disagree on what principles have and have not attained the status.

List of treaties by number of parties
Below is the list of treaties by number of parties. Only treaties with a minimum of 170 parties are included.

Notes

References

 

Treaties